Woodstock, sometimes called New Woodstock, was a parliamentary constituency in the United Kingdom named after the town of Woodstock in the county of Oxfordshire.

History
The Parliamentary Borough comprised the town of Woodstock and (from 1832) the surrounding countryside and villages, and elected two Members of Parliament from its re-enfranchisement in 1553 until 1832. Under the Great Reform Act 1832, the representation of the borough was reduced to one member.

Under the Redistribution of Seats Act 1885, the borough was abolished and was reconstituted as the Mid or Woodstock Division of Oxfordshire when the three-member Parliamentary County of Oxfordshire was divided into the three single-member constituencies of Banbury, Woodstock and Henley.  It comprised the middle part of Oxfordshire, including Witney and Bicester as well as the abolished borough.

The constituency was abolished under the Representation of the People Act 1918.  The western half, including Witney and Woodstock, was added to the Banbury Division and the eastern half, including Bicester, to the Henley Division.

Boundaries
1885–1918: The Municipal Borough of Oxford, the Sessional Divisions of Bampton East, Bampton West, Ploughley, and Wooton South, and part of the Sessional Division of Bullingdon.

Only non-resident freeholders of the Parliamentary Borough Oxford (which included the Municipal Borough thereof) were entitled to vote.

Members of Parliament

1553–1640

1640–1832

1832–1918

Elections

Elections in the 1830s

 Buckingham and Richardson each received 138 householder votes, but these were declared ineligible

Peyton resigned, causing a by-election.

Elections in the 1840s
Spencer-Churchill succeeded to the peerage, becoming 6th Duke of Marlborough and causing a by-election.

Thesiger was appointed Solicitor-General for England and Wales and decided to contest Abingdon, causing a by-election.

Spencer-Churchill resigned by accepting the office of Steward of the Chiltern Hundreds, causing a by-election.

Loftus succeeded to the peerage, becoming 3rd Marquess of Ely and causing a by-election.

Elections in the 1850s

Spencer-Churchill succeeded to the peerage, becoming 7th Duke of Marlborough and causing a by-election.

Elections in the 1860s

Elections in the 1870s

Elections in the 1880s

Churchill was appointed Secretary of State for India, requiring a by-election.

Elections in the 1890s
Maclean resigned after being appointed a Master in Lunacy.

Elections in the 1900s

Elections in the 1910s

General Election 1914–15:

Another General Election was required to take place before the end of 1915. The political parties had been making preparations for an election to take place and by July 1914, the following candidates had been selected;
Unionist: Henderson
Liberal:

References

Robert Beatson, A Chronological Register of Both Houses of Parliament (London: Longman, Hurst, Res & Orme, 1807) 
D Brunton & D H Pennington, Members of the Long Parliament (London: George Allen & Unwin, 1954)
Cobbett's Parliamentary history of England, from the Norman Conquest in 1066 to the year 1803 (London: Thomas Hansard, 1808) 
 The Constitutional Year Book for 1913 (London: National Union of Conservative and Unionist Associations, 1913)
F W S Craig, British Parliamentary Election Results 1832–1885 (2nd edition, Aldershot: Parliamentary Research Services, 1989)
 J Holladay Philbin, Parliamentary Representation 1832 – England and Wales (New Haven: Yale University Press, 1965)

Parliamentary constituencies in Oxfordshire (historic)
Constituencies of the Parliament of the United Kingdom established in 1571
Constituencies of the Parliament of the United Kingdom disestablished in 1918